Springer is a town in Colfax County, New Mexico, United States. Its population was 1,047 at the 2010 census.

History

In 1877, William T Thornton, representing the Maxwell Land Grand and Railway Company commissioned Melvin Whitson Mills to "sell, locate, survey, map  and plat, and lay out town site, no exceeding three hundred and twenty acres".  Judge Mills selected a location along the Cimarron called Las Garzas and laid out the townsite and graded the streets.  The Maxwell Land Grand and Railway Company conveyed the deed to Mills on 31 March 1880. The deed bequeathed the town Maxwell, but by 1883 according to the deed for the Mills Mansion, it was called Springer.

The town was the county seat of Colfax County from 1882—1897 and keeps the former Courthouse as a museum. The location was chosen due to anticipation of the Atchison, Topeka and Santa Fe Railway coming and as it was halfway between the Mountain Branch and Cimarron Cutoff of the Santa Fe Trail.

The former Colfax County Courthouse in Springer is now a visitor center and museum. It was built for $9,800 in the early 1880s.

It was besieged by rioters during the Colfax County War and only saved from fire by Union Soldiers arriving to kick away burning bales of hay around it.

It has had multiple uses over the years, including the site of the Raton Reform School for Boys (1910–1917). It has also been a library, the Springer town hall, and a jail. Outside the courthouse museum is a tall monument to the Ten Commandments. There is also a marker honoring Lance Corporal Chad Robert Hildebrandt (October 12, 1983—October 17, 2005), the first casualty in the Iraq War from Springer.

The correctional center is one of New Mexico's oldest detention facilities, having begun operation in 1909 as the New Mexico Boys' School.

Geography
Springer is located in southern Colfax County at  (36.363976, -104.593491).

Interstate 25 passes along the west side of the town, with access from exits 412 and 414. I-25 leads north  to Raton, the county seat, and southwest  to Las Vegas. The western terminus of U.S. Routes 56 and 412 is in the center of Springer.

Demographics

As of the census of 2000, there were 1,285 people, 520 households, and 372 families residing in the town. The population density was 876.6 people per square mile (337.5/km). There were 605 housing units at an average density of 412.7 per square mile (158.9/km). The racial makeup of the town was 79.46% White, 1.09% Native American, 14.94% from other races, and 4.51% from two or more races. Hispanic or Latino of any race were 69.96% of the population.

There were 520 households, out of which 33.1% had children under the age of 18 living with them, 51.2% were married couples living together, 14.2% had a female householder with no husband present, and 28.3% were non-families. 26.5% of all households were made up of individuals, and 13.3% had someone living alone who was 65 years of age or older. The average household size was 2.41 and the average family size was 2.86.

In the town, the population was spread out, with 25.9% under the age of 18, 5.2% from 18 to 24, 25.1% from 25 to 44, 22.3% from 45 to 64, and 21.5% who were 65 years of age or older. The median age was 40 years. For every 100 females, there were 98.0 males. For every 100 females age 18 and over, there were 92.7 males.

The median income for a household in the town was $27,850, and the median income for a family was $34,563. Males had a median income of $24,479 versus $19,000 for females. The per capita income for the town was $14,606. About 14.9% of families and 16.6% of the population were below the poverty line, including 28.0% of those under age 18 and 8.9% of those age 65 or over.

Notable people 

 Antoun Saadeh - Lebanese politician and founder of the Syrian Social Nationalist Party
 Fred Graham - athlete and actor
 Ernest Medina - former captain of infantry in the United States Army
 Antonio M. Fernandez - member of the U.S. House of Representatives, 1943 - 1956

References

External links

 Springer Municipal Schools
 Springer Economic Development

Towns in Colfax County, New Mexico
Towns in New Mexico